Rent-A-Girlfriend is an anime series adapted from the manga series of the same title written by Reiji Miyajima. A total of two seasons has been produced. The first season aired from July 11, 2020 to September 26, 2020 on the Super Animeism programming block on MBS and other networks. The second season aired from July 2, 2022 to September 17, 2022. A third season is set to premiere in July 2023.

Series overview

Episodes

Season 1 (2020)

Season 2 (2022)

Notes

References

External links
  

Lists of anime episodes